La Libertad is a town and municipality in the Guatemalan department of Huehuetenango. It is situated at 1720 metres above sea level. The municipality has a population of 38,234 (2018 census) and covers an area of 231km2.

References

External links

Muni in Spanish

Municipalities of the Huehuetenango Department